Under a Nouveau Groove is the third studio album by American contemporary R&B group Club Nouveau. It was released October 23, 1989 on Warner Bros. Records.

Track listing
"No Friend of Mine" — 4:27
"Under a Nouveau Groove" — 5:33
"Momentary Lover" — 5:47
"I'm Sorry (a.k.a. I'm So Sorry)" — 4:37
"No Secrets" — 4:33
"Share Your Love" — 5:47
"Time" — 4:36
"Money Can't Buy You Love" — 5:27
"Still in Love" — 4:56
"Let Me Know" — 4:51
"Under a Nouveau Groove...the Story" — 4:36

Charts

References

External links
 Club Nouveau—Under a Nouveau Groove  at Discogs

1989 albums
Club Nouveau albums
Warner Records albums